Barnum is an unincorporated community in Polk County, in the U.S. state of Texas.

History
Barnum sprang up in 1881 around a sawmill built on a railroad line. Some believe the community was named after P. T. Barnum, an American businessman and circus founder, while other hold it was named for another Texas sawmill owner named Barnum.

References

Unincorporated communities in Polk County, Texas
Unincorporated communities in Texas